is a Fijian-born, Japanese international rugby union player who plays as a lock. He currently plays for the Shizuoka Blue Revs in Japan's domestic Japan Rugby League One.

Club career

Anise signed for Top League side, the Canon Eagles ahead of the 2016-17 season and instantly established himself as a regular starter with his new side.

International

After only 9 Top League games, Anise received his first call-up to his adopted country, Japan's senior squad ahead of the 2016 end-of-year rugby union internationals.

References

1986 births
Living people
Fijian expatriates in Japan
Fijian rugby union players
Japan international rugby union players
Rugby union locks
Rugby union flankers
Yokohama Canon Eagles players
People from Suva
Fijian expatriate rugby union players
Fiji National University alumni
Fijian people of Rotuman descent
Sunwolves players
Shizuoka Blue Revs players